Athletics competitions have been held at the biennial ALBA Games since the inaugural edition 2005 in Havana, Cuba. The Games are not only open for the member federations of the ALBA, but also for athletes from other nations.

Editions
The host cities were published.

Records
The list is compiled from the published results lists.

Men

Women

References

External links
2007 ALBA Games webpage
Athletics at the 2009 ALBA Games
Athletics at the 2011 ALBA Games

 
ALBA Games
ALBA Games